Albert Magnoli (born  1954) is an American film director, screenwriter and editor best known for helming the films Purple Rain, Tango & Cash (replacement director), Street Knight, and American Anthem. Magnoli also served as editor of the 1984 film Reckless.

Career
Magnoli graduated from the USC School of Cinema-Television in 1981.

In 1989, Magnoli briefly (from February to November) served as the manager of musical artist Prince.

Accolades
In 2019, Magnoli's film Purple Rain was selected by the Library of Congress for preservation in the United States National Film Registry for being "culturally, historically, or aesthetically significant".

Filmography
1979 : Jazz (short film) 
1984 : Reckless (editor)
1984 : Purple Rain
1986 : American Anthem
1987 : Never Enough (music video for Patty Smyth)
1987 : Sign o' the Times (additional footage, uncredited)
1989 : Batdance (music video for Prince)
1989 : Scandalous (music video for Prince)
1989 : Tango & Cash (replaced Andrei Konchalovsky, uncredited)
1989 : Partyman (music video for Prince)
1993 : Street Knight
1993 : Born to Run (TV Movie)
1997 : Dark Planet (1997)
1997 : Nash Bridges season 2, episode 23 Deliverance

References

External links
 
 
 
 Huffingtonpost : The director of Purple Rain Prince Memories

American film directors
American film editors
American male screenwriters
USC School of Cinematic Arts alumni
American writers of Italian descent
1950s births
Living people
American people of Italian descent